Drosera fimbriata, the Manypeaks sundew, is a perennial tuberous species in the genus Drosera that is endemic to Western Australia. It grows to 10 to 15 cm tall with two or three whorls of non-carnivorous leaves on the lower portion of the stem and 2 to 5 whorls of carnivorous leaves above that. It is native to a region mostly around Manypeaks but with populations near the Scott River and near Denmark. It grows in winter-wet sandy soils in heathland. It flowers in October.

It was first formally described by Larry Eugene DeBuhr in 1975.

See also 
List of Drosera species

References 

Carnivorous plants of Australia
Caryophyllales of Australia
Eudicots of Western Australia
Plants described in 1975
fimbriata